Sobha Group LLC  is a GCC based real estate developer headquartered in Dubai .
The company was established in 1976 as an interior decoration firm in Oman by Mr P.N.C. Menon. The company is functional in the UAE, Oman, Bahrain, Brunei. Sobha Group LLC was a case study at Harvard Business School. It recorded a sales target of USD 1 billion in 2021.

Key People
Mr P.N.C. Menon is the Founder and Chairman of Sobha Group LLC. P.N.C. Menon hails from Palakkad in Kerala, and established Sobha Group, a multinational real estate and construction group with diversified investments in the UAE, Oman, Bahrain, Brunei, and Tanzania.

Masterplan Communities

Sobha Hartland
Sobha Realty is currently developing Sobha Hartland, a community spread across eight million square feet launched in 2014 in the heart of Dubai, as part of the Mohammed Bin Rashid Al Maktoum City (MBR City) master development. The project, which is estimated at USD 4 billion,  with 2.4 million square feet of its total land area encompassing over 300 different species of plants and trees. The development also houses the Hartland International School and North London Collegiate School Dubai.

District One
The Meydan Sobha “District One” project was launched in Phase-1 and Phase-2, with an overall value of US$8 billion.

References

Property companies of the United Arab Emirates
 

Companies based in Dubai
 Multinational companies headquartered in the United Arab Emirates